The arrondissement of Auxerre is an arrondissement of France in the Yonne department in the Bourgogne-Franche-Comté region. It has 170 communes.

Composition

The communes of the arrondissement of Auxerre, and their INSEE codes, are:

 Aigremont (89002)
 Andryes (89007)
 Appoigny (89013)
 Augy (89023)
 Auxerre (89024)
 Bassou (89029)
 Bazarnes (89030)
 Beaumont (89031)
 Beauvoir (89033)
 Beine (89034)
 Bellechaume (89035)
 Béru (89039)
 Bessy-sur-Cure (89040)
 Beugnon (89041)
 Bleigny-le-Carreau (89045)
 Bléneau (89046)
 Bonnard (89050)
 Branches (89053)
 Brienon-sur-Armançon (89055)
 Butteaux (89061)
 Carisey (89062)
 Chablis (89068)
 Chailley (89069)
 Champcevrais (89072)
 Champignelles (89073)
 Champlost (89076)
 Champs-sur-Yonne (89077)
 La Chapelle-Vaupelteigne (89081)
 Charbuy (89083)
 Charentenay (89084)
 Charmoy (89085)
 Charny-Orée-de-Puisaye (89086)
 Chassy (89088)
 Chemilly-sur-Serein (89095)
 Chemilly-sur-Yonne (89096)
 Cheny (89099)
 Chéu (89101)
 Chevannes (89102)
 Chichery (89105)
 Chichée (89104)
 Chitry (89108)
 Coulangeron (89117)
 Coulanges-la-Vineuse (89118)
 Coulanges-sur-Yonne (89119)
 Courgis (89123)
 Courson-les-Carrières (89125)
 Crain (89129)
 Deux Rivières (89130)
 Diges (89139)
 Dracy (89147)
 Druyes-les-Belles-Fontaines (89148)
 Égleny (89150)
 Épineau-les-Voves (89152)
 Escamps (89154)
 Escolives-Sainte-Camille (89155)
 Esnon (89156)
 Étais-la-Sauvin (89158)
 La Ferté-Loupière (89163)
 Festigny (89164)
 Fleury-la-Vallée (89167)
 Fleys (89168)
 Fontaines (89173)
 Fontenay-près-Chablis (89175)
 Fontenay-sous-Fouronnes (89177)
 Fontenoy (89179)
 Fouronnes (89182)
 Germigny (89186)
 Gurgy (89198)
 Gy-l'Évêque (89199)
 Hauterive (89200)
 Les Hauts de Forterre (89405)
 Héry (89201)
 Irancy (89202)
 Jaulges (89205)
 Jussy (89212)
 Lain (89215)
 Lainsecq (89216)
 Lalande (89217)
 Laroche-Saint-Cydroine (89218)
 Lasson (89219)
 Lavau (89220)
 Leugny (89221)
 Levis (89222)
 Lichères-près-Aigremont (89224)
 Lignorelles (89226)
 Ligny-le-Châtel (89227)
 Lindry (89228)
 Lucy-sur-Cure (89233)
 Lucy-sur-Yonne (89234)
 Mailly-la-Ville (89237)
 Mailly-le-Château (89238)
 Maligny (89242)
 Mercy (89249)
 Méré (89250)
 Merry-Sec (89252)
 Merry-la-Vallée (89251)
 Mézilles (89254)
 Migé (89256)
 Migennes (89257)
 Monéteau (89263)
 Montholon (89003)
 Montigny-la-Resle (89265)
 Mont-Saint-Sulpice (89268)
 Mouffy (89270)
 Moulins-sur-Ouanne (89272)
 Moutiers-en-Puisaye (89273)
 Neuvy-Sautour (89276)
 Nitry (89277)
 Les Ormes (89281)
 Ormoy (89282)
 Ouanne (89283)
 Parly (89286)
 Paroy-en-Othe (89288)
 Percey (89292)
 Perrigny (89295)
 Poilly-sur-Serein (89303)
 Poilly-sur-Tholon (89304)
 Pontigny (89307)
 Pourrain (89311)
 Prégilbert (89314)
 Préhy (89315)
 Quenne (89319)
 Rogny-les-Sept-Écluses (89324)
 Ronchères (89325)
 Rouvray (89328)
 Sainpuits (89331)
 Saint-Bris-le-Vineux (89337)
 Saint-Cyr-les-Colons (89341)
 Sainte-Pallaye (89363)
 Saint-Fargeau (89344)
 Saint-Florentin (89345)
 Saint-Georges-sur-Baulche (89346)
 Saint-Martin-des-Champs (89352)
 Saint-Maurice-le-Vieil (89360)
 Saint-Maurice-Thizouaille (89361)
 Saint-Privé (89365)
 Saint-Sauveur-en-Puisaye (89368)
 Saints-en-Puisaye (89367)
 Seignelay (89382)
 Sementron (89383)
 Senan (89384)
 Sery (89394)
 Sommecaise (89397)
 Sormery (89398)
 Sougères-en-Puisaye (89400)
 Soumaintrain (89402)
 Tannerre-en-Puisaye (89408)
 Thury (89416)
 Toucy (89419)
 Treigny-Perreuse-Sainte-Colombe (89420)
 Trucy-sur-Yonne (89424)
 Turny (89425)
 Val-de-Mercy (89426)
 Le Val-d'Ocre (89334)
 Vallan (89427)
 Valravillon (89196)
 Varennes (89430)
 Venizy (89436)
 Venouse (89437)
 Venoy (89438)
 Vergigny (89439)
 Vermenton (89441)
 Villefargeau (89453)
 Villeneuve-Saint-Salves (89463)
 Villeneuve-les-Genêts (89462)
 Villiers-Saint-Benoît (89472)
 Villiers-Vineux (89474)
 Villy (89477)
 Vincelles (89478)
 Vincelottes (89479)

History

The arrondissement of Auxerre was created in 1800. At the January 2017 reorganisation of the arrondissements of Yonne, it received 13 communes from the arrondissement of Avallon, and it lost three communes to the arrondissement of Avallon and 12 communes to the arrondissement of Sens.

As a result of the reorganisation of the cantons of France which came into effect in 2015, the borders of the cantons are no longer related to the borders of the arrondissements. The cantons of the arrondissement of Auxerre were, as of January 2015:

 Aillant-sur-Tholon
 Auxerre-Est
 Auxerre-Nord
 Auxerre-Nord-Ouest
 Auxerre-Sud
 Auxerre-Sud-Ouest
 Bléneau
 Brienon-sur-Armançon
 Chablis
 Charny
 Coulanges-la-Vineuse
 Coulanges-sur-Yonne
 Courson-les-Carrières
 Joigny
 Ligny-le-Châtel
 Migennes
 Saint-Fargeau
 Saint-Florentin
 Saint-Sauveur-en-Puisaye
 Seignelay
 Toucy
 Vermenton

References

Auxerre